SelectaDNA is a forensic property marking system used as part of crime prevention strategies for businesses and residential properties.

SelectaDNA offers a full range of property and offender marking products combining its unique DNA coding with microdot technology. SelectaDNA is a Police-approved Secured By Design product with no annual licence fees.

SelectaDNA is used to ‘tag’ valuable property, infrastructure, and criminals, and is available in a number of formats including vehicle marking solutions (combining DNA and microdot technology), Defence Sprays to deter anti-social behaviour and moped-enabled crime, and SelectaDNA Trace for metal protection and Intruder Sprays for robbery prevention and transport protection. Formats for covert operations include transferable Gels, Grease and, Trespass Beads. SelectaDNA not only reduces crime but also enables Police to link criminals to crime scenes and secure convictions.

One use is in protecting farm equipment. In the event that any items are stolen and recovered by Police, they are immediately traceable back to the individual farm.
PCSP Chairman Alderman Robert Smith said: “Armagh, Banbridge and Craigavon PCSP is happy to be part of this pilot project and to be able to provide some support to local farmers protect their property using SelectaDNA.

Every marking kit and spray canister has a unique forensic DNA signature which is a series of combinations of A (Adenine), C (Cytosine), G (Guanine) and T (Thymine). The synthetic DNA used is short-chain, making it far more robust than human DNA.

The details of the code are recorded on a database so that a code found on an asset or person can be deciphered by a molecular genetic laboratory and identified back to a specific owner or location.

See also
SmartWater

References

External links

A Spray of DNA to Keep the Robbers Away - NYTimes.com
Mark Shields turns to SelectaDNA for crime prevention Jamaica Observer
Policing and Community Safety Partnership Ploughs Into Rural Crime, professionalsecurity.ie
'DNA spray' which clings to fleeing moped raiders being trialled to clampdown on soaring street crime, itv.com

Security technology